Rongcheng may refer to:

Rong Cheng Shi (容成氏), a bamboo manuscript recovered in 1994
Rongcheng, Shandong (荣成市), county-level city in Weihai, Shandong, China
Rongcheng County (容城县), county in Baoding, Hebei, China
Rongcheng District (榕城区), district in Jieyang, Guangdong, China
Rongcheng, Hubei, a town in Jianli County, Jingzhou, Hubei, China
An alternative name (蓉城) for Chengdu, Sichuan, China
An alternative name (榕城) for Fuzhou, Fujian, China
An alternative name (榕城) for the Taipei Municipal Datong High School, a high school in Zhongshan District, Taipei, Taiwan
Chengdu Rongcheng F.C., a football club in Chengdu, China